Salor Indah or Salor is a kampung in Kurik District, Merauke Regency, South Papua, Indonesia. It is being developed as Kota Terpadu Mandiri (self-contained integrated city/town). Salor City will also be the administrative centre of South Papua Province.

The following table is a climate table average for Salor:

References 

Villages in South Papua